Coleophora tytri is a moth of the family Coleophoridae. It is found in Turkestan and Uzbekistan.

The larvae feed on Salsola gemmascens. They create a case of hollowed fruits. It consists of two immature fruits or rarely of one large fruit. The case is silky, somewhat slender and slightly curved. The valve is three-sided and made after cutting the fruit in the caudal part of the case. The length of the case is 4.5-5.3 mm and it is chocolate-brown to yellow, usually with light ocherous tinge. The case of the young larvae is yellowish. The larvae can be found from September to October.

References

tytri
Moths of Asia
Moths described in 1970